Pablo Cuevas was the defending champion. He reached the final, but he lost to Máximo González 6–1, 3–6, 4–6.

Seeds

Draw

Finals

Top half

Bottom half

References
Main Draw
Qualifying Singles

2010 ATP Challenger Tour
2010 Singles
2010 in Uruguayan tennis